Nikolai Kryukov may refer to:

 Nikolai Kryukov (gymnast) (born 1978), Russian artistic gymnast
 Nikolai Kryukov (actor) (1915–1993), Soviet film and theater actor
 Nikolai Kryukov (composer) (1908–1961), Russian composer